Stellingen is a railway station on the Hamburg-Altona–Kiel line, northern Germany, served by the Hamburg S-Bahn and the commuter trains of AKN (A-Bahn). The station is located in the Hamburg borough of Eimsbüttel, west of Hamburg Inner City, and a little east to Imtech Arena (Volksparkstadion). In direct neighborhood to the station, motorway A7 crosses above the elevated railway tracks.

Station layout 
The elevated station has one island platform with 2 tracks and one exit. The station is fully accessible for handicapped persons; there is a lift and a special floor layout for blind persons.

A small shop in the station sells fast food and newspapers. There are no lockers. No personnel is present at the station but there are SOS and information telephones, ticket machines and 25 parking spaces. In front of the station is a taxicab stand.

Station services

Rail 
The commuter trains of the line A1 call at Langenfelde only during the rush hours. The rapid transit trains of the lines S3 and S21 of the Hamburg S-Bahn call at the station.

The direction of the trains on track 1 is northbound towards Kaltenkirchen and Neumünster (A1), Pinneberg (S3) and Elbgaustraße (S21). On track 2 the trains run southbound in the direction Hamburg central station (A1), Stade (S3) and Aumühle (S21).

Bus 
Two bus routes call at a bus stop located in the station forecourt in the east.

Gallery

See also

 Hamburger Verkehrsverbund (HVV)
 Imtech Arena

References

External links 

DB station information 
Network plan HVV

Hamburg S-Bahn stations in Hamburg
Buildings and structures in Eimsbüttel
Railway stations in Germany opened in 1903